IRIB Transmitting Station ( – Farstandeh-ye Şedā va Sīmā) is a populated place and transmitting station of Islamic Republic of Iran Broadcasting (IRIB), in Bahmanshir-e Shomali Rural District, in the Central District of Abadan County, Khuzestan Province, Iran. At the 2006 census, its population was 17, in 5 families.

References 

Populated places in Abadan County